Folin's reagent or sodium 1,2-naphthoquinone-4-sulfonate is a chemical reagent used as a derivatizing agent to measure levels of amines and amino acids. The reagent reacts with them in alkaline solution to produce a fluorescent material that can be easily detected.

This should not be confused with Folin-Ciocalteu reagent, that is used to detect phenolic compounds.

The Folin reagent can be used with an acidic secondary reagent to distinguish MDMA and related compounds from PMMA and related compounds.

See also
Pill testing
Sullivan reaction
 Dille–Koppanyi reagent
Froehde reagent
Liebermann reagent
Mandelin reagent
Marquis reagent
Mecke reagent
Simon's reagent
 Zwikker reagent

References

Biochemistry detection reactions
Chemical tests
Drug testing reagents
1,2-Naphthoquinones
Naphthalenesulfonates